Aisha Stambouli is a Venezuelan actress, singer and songwriter.

Biography

Early years
Stambouli was born in Caracas on May 27, 1993 as Irene Romina Stambouli Lazzereschi, to Víctor Stambouli Mattatia and Stefania Lazzereschi. She grew up in a Jewish family.

Artistic career
Her career began in 2009 with the main role in the juvenile telenovela ¡Qué clase de amor!; the telenovela also had a full album soundtrack, with Stambouli singing 4 of the 11 songs in it. In 2013, she participated in the historic telenovela Guerreras y Centauros, set in the 19th century during the days of the Battle of Carabobo, which was a central event in the Venezuelan War of Independence. Also, she has taken small roles in venezuelam films such as Tamara and Des-Autorizados

In 2017, Stambouli released her album Tu la tienes que pagar, a cover of the French-Venezuelan singer Natusha, which reached the top of the Venezuelan Tropical Music charts, followed by her biggest success in the venezuelan charts, Te quiero, a duet with Tito 10, her fellow co-star in ¡Qué clase de amor!.

On May 25, 2020, a second season of ¡Qué clase de amor!, now converted into a web-based format consisting of 3 episodes, was launched through the series' screenwriter Benjamin Cohen's Instagram account. The new season had to be recorded through video calls using different applications, such as WhatsApp, is due to the COVID-19 pandemic and also since several of the actors were in different parts of the world.

Personal life

Stambouli married her manager, the music producer Alberto Kauam on September 28, 2019. Kauam was found dead in his office on May 11, 2020, with a shot in his head. On May 30, 2020, Stambouli gave birth to a son, which was named Eithan at the brit milah ceremony held in her house.

On April 01, 2021, Stambouli's father, Víctor, died of complications associated with COVID-19, and on April 27, 2021, her paternal uncle, the political analyst and university professor Andrés Stambouli, died also due to complications associated with COVID-19.

Discography

Albums
Más Allá (2009)
Tu la tienes queue pagar (2017)

Singles
¡Qué clase de amor! (2016)
Te Quiero (2017)
No te voy a Olvidar (2018)
Deseo  (2020)
Siempre te amaré (2021)

Filmography

Telenovelas

Films

References

External links

Living people
1993 births
Venezuelan women singer-songwriters
Venezuelan Jews
Venezuelan actresses